McCreight is a surname. Notable people with the surname include:

Edward M. McCreight (born 1941), American computer scientist
John Foster McCreight (1827–1913), Canadian lawyer and politician
Kimberly McCreight, American author
Tim McCreight (born 1951), American artist